'Masiel or Masielo and Masiela may refer to:

Masiel
Jan Masiel (born 1963), Polish politician

Masiela
Masiela Lusha (born 1985), Albanian-American actress, author, producer and humanitarian

Masiello

Andrea Masiello (born 1986), Italian soccer player
Anthony Masiello, Buffalo, New York, politician
Luciano Masiello (born 1952), Italian-born English and Irish soccer player
Salvatore Masiello (born 1982), Italian soccer player
Wendy M. Masiello, United States Air Force officer

See also
Massiel, Spanish singer